Quinuajirca or Kinwa Hirka (Quechua kinwa Chenopodium quinoa, Ancash Quechua hirka mountain, "quinoa mountain", also spelled Quinuajirca) is a mountain in the eastern extensions of the Cordillera Blanca in the Andes of Peru which reaches a height of approximately . It is located in the Ancash Region, Huari Province, Huari District. Quinuajirca lies at the Rurichinchay valley, northeast of the peak of Chinchey.

References

Mountains of Peru
Mountains of Ancash Region